The Forest for the Trees is a 2003 German film directed by Maren Ade in her feature film directorial debut.

The movie premiered at the 2003 Hof International Film Festival before going on to play at the 2004 Toronto International Film Festival and the 2005 Sundance Film Festival.

Plot
Melanie Pröschle is a 27-year-old school teacher who moves to Karlsruhe to work at a new school. Melanie is optimistic about her new life but she is quickly demoralized by her difficulty making friends in the new city and by the unruly students she can't control.

After a student throws chocolate milk on her, Melanie tries to discipline him by talking to his mother, but after his mother dismisses the incident, Melanie covers it up.

Melanie manages to befriend Tina, a salesgirl who sells her a jacket and who happens to live in the same tenement building as she does. After Tina visits Melanie in her apartment, the two get drunk and, realizing that Tina's apartment is viewable from Melanie's apartment, they end up spying on Tina's ex, Tobias, as he enters the apartment. Melanie continues to pursue Tina's friendship, but things quickly become awkward as Melanie spies on Tina from her apartment and goes out of her way to chase down Tina.

At school, things take a turn for the worse when Melanie overhears two colleagues discussing her and how she lets the children run wild. Upset, Melanie calls her mother, but rather than worry her, ends up cancelling her planned trip home to stay in Karlsruhe over vacation. She spends her vacation alone, spying on Tina as she goes out with her other friends.

As the new term begins, Melanie continues to have problems at school and with Tina. She is relieved when Tina invites her to her birthday party; however, she bumps into Tobias outside and, introducing herself, tells him it would be better if he didn't come inside. Tobias then gives her flowers to deliver to Tina. When Tina realizes that Melanie told Tobias not to come up, she tells her to leave.

Melanie's attempts to reconnect with Tina fail and while spying on Tina from her window, she spots Tobias and Tina peering back at her and appearing to make fun of her. Upset, Melanie begins to miss work obligations, skipping parent-teacher night. The following day she leaves class in the middle of the day, gets in her car and begins to drive. As she drives, she lets go of the wheel and climbs into the back seat where she calmly surveys the scenery.

Cast
Eva Löbau as Melanie Pröschle
Daniela Holtz as Tina Schaffner
Jan Neumann as Thorsten Rehm
 as Frau Sussmann
 as Tobias
Heinz Röser-Dümmig as Lutger Reinhardt
Martina Eckrich as Renate Pföhler
Nina Fiedler as Bine
Hans-Rüdiger Kucich as	Gerd Postweiler
Ruth Köppler as Elvira Fischer-Walter
Achim Enchelmaier as Bernd
 as Melanie's mother
Volker Jeck as Melanies Vater
Hans-Peter Gastiger as recycler
Andreas Bornhardt as Garden Center worker
Violetta Breuer as neighbor
Siegfried Schneider as Herr Meiser

Film development
The film was Ade's thesis film for film school. Ade based the movie on stories her parents, who both were teachers, had told her.

Release
The Forest for the Trees was released on DVD on February 1, 2006 by Film Movement.

Reception

Awards
In 2005, The Forest for the Trees won the top award at three international film festivals: the Indie Lisboa Festival (in Portugal), the Newport Film Festival, and the Valencia Golden Jove Film Festival.

Critical response
On review aggregator website Rotten Tomatoes, the film has an approval rating of 77% based on 13 critics, with an average rating of 6.3/10.

Jamie Woolley of BBC wrote "For a first film, it's accomplished; for a college project, it's astonishing".

Time Out commented "Eva Lbau's lynchpin performance as Melanie is a shattering lesson in the tropes of timidity and awkwardness, and serves in taking this cinema of cruelty into as yet uncharted territory".

According to Eddie Cockrell of Variety "Tapping in to primal fears of professional ineptitude and social rejection with an almost sadistic meticulousness, The Forest for the Trees is a precisely modulated first film".

References

External links

Films about educators
Films about school violence
Films directed by Maren Ade
2003 directorial debut films
Films set in Baden-Württemberg
2000s German-language films
2000s German films